The Moheli white-eye (Zosterops comorensis) is a species of bird in the family Zosteropidae.

It is endemic to Mohéli of the Comoros.

Its natural habitat is subtropical or tropical moist lowland forest.

References

Zosterops
Birds described in 1900
Taxa named by George Ernest Shelley